The seventh season of Chinese television series Singer (previously titled I Am a Singer) was broadcast on Hunan Television between January and April 2019. Singer 2019 was produced by Hong Tao, and its music director was Hong Kong senior musician Kubert Leung. The first episode was recorded on January 4, 2019, and first premiered in Mango TV on January 11, 2019. YouTube also broadcast the episodes with the results replaced by commercial snippets.

The season ended on April 12, 2019, and Chinese singer Liu Huan named as the winner. Liu was the first mainland Chinese singer to win since Han Hong in season three, as well as the first male winner since Han Lei in season two. Taiwanese Sodagreen lead singer Wu Qing-feng and Chinese four-member band Super-Vocal (Frank Ju, Ayanga, Cai Chengyu, and ex-member Zheng Yunlong) finished runner-up and third place, respectively. For the first time, the top four singers were all male. This is also the first season since the inaugural season the season ended without the biennial concert held after the final.

Competition rules
Like the previous seasons of I Am a Singer and Singer, Singer 2019 was divided into four rounds of three stages, with seven singers performing for a 500-member audience each week. The electronic voting feature, first appeared as a pre-voting twist in the previous season, were introduced; the electronic voting (up to three votes) was conducted throughout the performance and accounted for 50% of the final score. Similar to the previous seasons, the accumulated votes from both Qualifiers and Knockouts determined which singer would be eliminated from the competition. The Challenge round, first introduced in season three, also returned. It featured a rule for contestants to beat at least four out of the seven remaining singers to stay in the competition.

The announcement of results was also changed: fourteen envelopes displaying the contestants' placements for the current round were placed on the table, among which seven envelopes were named envelopes that had the names of the contestants, and the other seven were numbered envelopes containing placement numbers. One by one, singers were tasked to select one envelope from each category and could view the result alone without the other singers. Singers were given the ability to disclose the results they had viewed—either by bluffing or revealing the actual results—to other contestants as they see fit. While the top four performers were able to receive their information on the placements for the round, the bottom three instead received blank envelopes, similar to season six where the placements were not announced until the Knockouts. The managers also had the option to reveal the electronic voting results.

In terms of song selections, each contestant could only pick their own songs for their first appearance. After each round, if a contestant finished first, the singer may select their own song for next week's show. Additionally, managers or contestants may also survey other performers under isolation, without influencing or impeding other potential contestants.

Beginning from the second round, singers, usually those with higher placements, were given WeChat messages to usher their way to the stage to check envelopes for the bottom three placements. Afterwards, Hong Tao would notify these singers about the safe results for the performance (and in the case of Knockouts, the singers' overall placements) and would sometimes discuss which singer would be eliminated. The remaining singers who did not receive messages would enter the room later, after which Hong Tao would announce the placements for the remaining placements (and in case of overall or challenge placement, the eliminated singer). The electronic voting results, which were also revealed at the end of the show, were announced privately to each singer's respective manager after each performance ended under isolation to other managers with the audio muted.

National's Recommended Singer 
Organised by Sina Weibo, an online spin-off called National's Recommended Singer (踢馆赛全民举荐歌手) premiered on December 27, 2018. Similar to I Am a Singer- Who Will Challenge, singers and online viewers can recommend a potential singer. The requirements are to produce one musical composition, be at least 18 years of age, and be available at the scheduled time arranged by producers. During certain periods—usually a week between the recording and airing dates of the Qualifier Round, viewers are polled online to choose their top eligible singer, and the singer with the most votes is chosen as the National's Recommended Singer, who will then join the panel in the Knockouts where they will separately face a challenge against a Professional Challenger (专业踢馆歌手) in a Pre-Challenge Face-off (踢馆预选赛).

Hosted by Hong Tao, the face-off was streamed exclusively online concurrently with the current Knockout Round; it was not broadcast on television. The votes cast for the face-off were separate from those of the Knockout round, and the outcome (which would not be revealed until the Challenge round) depended on which singer received the majority of the votes. The winner of the face-off was given the Challenger status (and his or her manager) and the right to participate in the competition. However, a loss will result in his or her elimination and ineligibility to participate in the Breakouts, although the singer was still allowed to perform Return performances during the recording of the Challenge round (which was broadcast after the episode's end); due to the change, this is the first season not all previously eliminated singers (outside withdrawn singers) were eligible.

The first round's eligible contestants were Zheng Yiming, Bii, Eric Chou, and Liu Yuning. Voting ended on January 5, 2019, and Liu was voted the first National's Recommended Singer with 1,467,482 votes cast. On January 28, 2019, Jefferson Qian was chosen as the second National's Recommended Singer and faced Super-Vocal finalists for the second Pre-challenge face-off. On the third and final round, Angela Hui was chosen as the third and final National's Recommended Singer and faced Bii.

Although he did not participate in the Pre-Challenge Face-off, Chen Chusheng was also chosen by professionals and immediately became a challenger during the Ultimate Knockout or Challenge Round, due to one singer who did not perform that week because of an injury (see below).

Contestants
The following Singer 2019 contestants are listed in alphabetical order. Singers without a placement for the final are listed as finalists and singers who withdrew are listed as withdrawn.

Key:
 – Winner
 – Runner-up
 – Third place
 – Other finalist
 – Eliminated/Non-contestant (not eligible for Breakouts)
 – National's Recommended Singer

Future appearances
Cai Chengyu of Super-Vocal returned in season eight to serve as a temporary music partner for Charlie Zhou in episode five due to his original music partner being unavailable. Second season finalists from the same show entered the competition on episode eight as Surprise Challengers.

Results

Competition details

First round

Qualifying
Recording Date: January 4, 2019
Airing date: January 11, 2019

This round's performance order was determined through each contestant's preferred style.

Knockouts
Recording Date: January 10, 2019
Airing date: January 18, 2019

Overall ranking
During the announcement of the results, the placement for some singers (Yang Kun, Escape Plan and Melanie Zhang) were blanked and were later revealed by Hong Tao after all the singers had opened their envelopes.

Challenge

Pre-Challenge Face-off
Recording Date: January 10, 2019
Airing date: January 18, 2019

The first National's Recommended Singer is Liu Yuning, and the first Professional Challenger is ANU.

Main Show
Recording Date: January 17, 2019
Airing date: January 25, 2019

During the episode, Yang Kun's manager, Li Weijia, left in the middle of the taping due to participate the Chinese New Year Worldwide Celebration 2019.

Total percentages of votes
The results are announced in a traditional format similar to the past seasons- the seven singers are seated on one row and Hong Tao announces a certain placement, one-by-one.

Second round

Qualifying
Recording Date: January 24, 2019
Airing date: February 1, 2019

The first substitute singer for the season was Polina Gagarina. Starting from this round, results were revealed in batches, starting with singers with a higher ranking receiving WeChat messages and being informed on placements in private. Also on the same episodes, separate scores for paper and electronic votes were also revealed.

During the announcement of the results, the top four singers received envelopes for the round, but placements for the top three singers had information in it. A fourth empty envelope had no placement (for Kostov), Yang read the fourth-place envelope which had the name inside.

Knockouts
Recording Date: January 31, 2019
Airing date: February 8, 2019

Three singers were chosen at random, not knowing that they were safe. They were given messages to enter the room to view the results for the bottom three singers for the Knockout round. A fourth singer (Yang Kun) later received a separate message to view the results for the top four placements. The last three singers (ANU, Chyi Yu and Kristian Kostov) entered the room last, after which Hong Tao announced the results in full.

Overall ranking

Challenge

Pre-Challenge Face-off
Recording Date: January 31, 2019
Airing date: February 15, 2019

The second National's Recommended Singer is Jefferson Qian, and the second Professional Challenger consisted of Super-Vocal finalist members Frank Ju, Ayanga, Zheng Yunlong, and Cai Chengyu; their music manager Neil Gao was also a Super-Vocal finalist.

Main Show
Recording Date: February 1, 2019
Airing date: February 15, 2019

Total percentages of votes
The results for the Knockout were announced in batches. Five singers, including the Challenger Super-Vocal finalists, were selected at random through WeChat messages. The results for the first four safe singers were announced, while the audio from the backstage was switched off. The last two singers (Yang and Kostov) later entered the room after Gagarina's announcement, and the other placements for this round were revealed.

Third round

Qualifying
Recording Date: February 14, 2019
Airing date: February 22, 2019

The second substitute singer for the season was Faith Yang.

During the announcement of the results, the top four singers received envelopes for the round, while Gagarina was given an empty envelope. Hong Tao later announced that she finished first for the round.

Knockout
Recording Date: February 21, 2019
Airing date: March 1, 2019

The results for the Knockout were announced via envelopes. The envelope with the identities of the first and last place singers were concealed; the latter had "I'm Won't Tell You" written on it. The identities were later revealed as Polina Gagarina and Faith Yang, respectively. After the envelopes were viewed, Hong Tao revealed the outcome for the round.

Overall ranking

Challenge

Pre-Challenge Face-off
Recording Date: February 21, 2019
Airing date: March 1, 2019

The third and final National's Recommended Singer is Angela Hui, and the third and final Professional Challenger is Bii.

Main Show
Recording Date: February 27, 2019
Airing date: March 8, 2019

Total percentages of votes
The results for the Challenge was the same from last week, except that the producers randomly selected five singers to reveal the envelopes first. Hong Tao announced the rankings for the aforementioned five singers; the last two singers (Hui and Wu) then entered the room with the same procedure. Polina Gagarina would have been eliminated for finishing last; however, Hui, who finished 6th, was unsuccessful in her challenge and was eliminated instead.

Fourth round

Qualifying
Recording Date: March 7, 2019
Airing date: March 15, 2019

The third and final substitute singer for the season was Gong Linna. For this week, the results for this round were void due to Gagarina's injury during this week. On March 12, Zheng Yunlong, one of the band members from the Super-vocal finalists, withdrew due to scheduling conflicts, hence reducing the team members down to three. A footage of Liu mentioning on his involvement of a coronary stent placement was unaired in this episode, but was shown on the following episode after his performance.

Total percentages of votes
While announcing the results, the top four singers received envelopes for the round while Gong was given an empty envelope. Hong Tao later announced that she finished first for the round. The second to fourth place singers entered the room first, and Hong Tao announced the results for two of the three placements. The last four singers entered the room next to reveal the first-place envelope, after which Hong Tao announced the result for the first-place singer. Due to Gagarina's bye in the following week, which caused this week's result to be void, all of the placements are immediately shown instead of just only the four.

Challenge
Recording Date: March 14, 2019
Airing date: March 22, 2019

During this, Gagarina was absent due to a back injury sustained during rehearsal; the round became a Challenge round while Gagarina was temporarily eliminated and then was substituted by Chen Chusheng, who then became the final challenger. During the performance, Wu and Liu were initially revealed to perform 6th and 1st, respectively, before their order was swapped. Season four contestant Kim Ji-Mun appeared as an assisting singer for Yang's performance.

Total percentages of votes
The results for the Challenge were announced in batches; four singers (Liu, Super-Vocal, Yang and Chyi) were selected at random to reveal the safe placements for the aforementioned four; the last three singers then entered the room next during the revealing of the other placements for this round.

Breakout
Recording Date: March 22, 2019
Airing date: March 29, 2019

Four of the seven singers who were initial singers—Chyi Yu, Liu Huan, Wu Qing-feng, and Yang Kun—were exempt for this round. The other three singers would participate along with the ousted singers (including Polina Gagarina, but not the three losing singers from the Pre-Challenge Face-off, namely Liu Yuning, Jefferson Qian and Bii) for a chance to enter the finals. The order for this round was determined through each contestant's status quo and their duration on the stage. Three singers have their performances fixed (Chen Chusheng and Super-Vocal respectively chose 9th and 10th as their choice, while Angela Hui was defaulted to perform 1st as a result of her unsuccessful Challenge); after each performance the singer randomly chose one envelope from a particular group of five singers and the singer that was chosen will perform after.

Similar to the last season's breakout, there were eliminations midway during the performance. Ten singers were grouped into two groups of five, with the first five singers grouped in group one, and the other five in group two. Electronic voting was conducted after each group's performance, and the lowest ranked singer from each group was immediately eliminated with their paper votes rendered void (Breakout failure). Angela Hui and Melanie Zhang were ranked lowest in the electronic voting for their respective groups.

The singers sang one song, and three of the remaining eight singers who had the most paper votes qualified for the finals. The Super-Vocal Finalists, Polina Gagarina, and Gong Linna placed in the top three and qualified for the Finals (Breakout success).

Total percentages of votes
The results are announced in a traditional format similar to the past seasons; during the results, Hong revealed that Chen, Kostov, Gagarina and Super-Vocal were the singers receiving a preliminary higher vote from Escape Plan, ANU, Yang and Gong respectively.

Finals Rush Hour
Recording Date: March 29, 2019
Airing date: April 5, 2019

The round before the finals was dubbed as "Santine Finals Rush Hour" (金典歌王冲刺夜). Its performance was a guest singer's duet. For this week, there is no voting and thus no results after the performance; for the first time in the show's history, public viewers instead cast their votes to decide the outcome for the round. These performances were recorded and shortly uploaded onto Mango TV; the voting period remained opened for seven days until the airing date on April 5. The top three singers who received the most votes from both the 500-member audience and public viewers were entitled to an advantage—a bonus 10, 20, and 30 votes for 3rd, 2nd, and 1st place singers, respectively—in the first round of the grand finals. The results, however, were not publicly revealed until the start of the finals.

The performance order for this round was first decided by the singer who received the most votes in a prior online fan voting- Super-Vocal finalists won the most votes and was fixed to perform last and decide the next performing singer to perform second-to-last and vice versa (i.e. the 6th performer selects the 5th performing singer, then the 5th singer decides the 4th singer, and so on). The exception was Chen Chusheng, despite being unsuccessful in the breakout round, was temporarily brought back as a guest singer by-virtue of never being eliminated in the competition and being added on impromptu; it was later revealed to have performed 7th in-between Liu and Super-Vocal finalists. Polina Gagarina performance was pre-recorded as she was on Russia due to a scheduling conflict with her concert performance at the time of filming; her music partner David served as a representative.

The episode generated controversy after one of the public audience members, Sakura Zou (邹小樱), made a post on Weibo accusing Super-Vocal Finalists for allegedly using unauthorized music after the show was aired. However, Souya Music replied on the day after the show that licenses to the program group were never issued and that no copyright violations occurred.

Finals
The finals were divided into two rounds, with the first song in the semi-finals being a duet with a guest singer and the second song in the grand finals being a solo encore performance. Similar to the previous season, votes cast were the sole determinant of the season's winner. 
Airing date: April 12, 2019

Round 1
The first round of the finals was a guest singer's duet. The grouping was decided by the singers starting with the most wins prior to the Breakouts (if there is a tie in terms of wins, a prior online vote serves as a tiebreak); each group can consist of either two or three members, meaning that two groups will be head-to-head and one being a three-way. After the groups are decided, one member drew lots to decide the order of performance for this round. The result of the grouping are reflected in the table below.

The singer with the most votes on each group directly advanced to Round 2, leaving the other four singers eligible for a "save" or second chance through a re-vote; the singer who received the most votes cast would be saved and would also advance to the second round.

Had Chyi Yu, Gong Linna and Polina Gagarina advanced to the next round, they would have performed, "掌声响起", "走西口", and "Those Were the Days" as their encore songs, respectively.

Round 2
The second round of the finals featured an encore song, and the singer who received the most votes (separate from the previous round's votes) was crowned the winner. The order for this round was determined by each singer's previous performance order from the first round, except for Yang Kun, who was defaulted to perform first after being the last contestant to advance. During the performance, Liu performed a medley of Empress Xiaoshengxian dedicated in memory of Yao Beina, a singer from The Voice of China (another show Liu was part of, as a coach), who died on January 16, 2015.

Winner of Battle
Liu Huan was declared the winner of Singer 2019 with 62.22% of the votes cast, leading by a 37.37% margin ahead of runner-up Wu Qing-feng. 62.22% was the highest vote percentage attained in the history of the show.

Ratings
Pre-show segments, such as Singer Gathering and Singer Announcement, and broadcast ratings from China Central Television are excluded from the rating and tally.

|-
| 1
| 
| 0.806
| 4.66
| 2
| 0.55
| 4.07
| 1
| Aired with season finale of Zhejiang Television's Sound of My Dream (season 3)
|-
| 2
| 
| 0.799
| 5.44
| 1
| 0.51
| 4.1
| 1
| 
|-
| 3
| 
| 
| 
| 2
| 0.59
| 
| 1
| Aired with season premiere of Zhejiang Television's Nice To Meet You
|-
| 4
| 
|0.756
|4.94
|3
|0.51
|3.82
|1
|
|-
| 5
| 
|0.823	
|5.03	
|3
|0.62	
|4.13	
|1
|Aired with season finale of Jiangsu Television's Best Time
|-
| 6
| 
|0.740
|4.64
|4
|0.43
| 
|2
|Aired with season premiere of Jiangsu Television's The Brain (season 6)
|-
| 7
| 
| 0.743
|4.77
|5
|0.46
|3.49
|3
|Aired with Jiangsu Television's Trump Card (season 4) after timeslot moved to Friday 21:10; Nice To Meet You timeslot moved to Saturday 22:00
|-
| 8
| 
| 0.750
| 4.98
| 6
| 0.43
| 3.37
| 3
|
|-
| 9
| 
| 0.636
| 4.57
| 8
| 
| 3.36
| 3
| 
|-
| 10
| 
| 0.646
| 4.41
| 6
| 0.39
| 3.19
| 3
| 
|-
| 11
| 
|0.692
|4.38
|7
|0.4
|3.12
|3
|
|-
| 12
| 
| 
|4.55
| 7
|0.42
| 3.99 
|3
|
|-
| 13
| 
| 0.659
| 5.00
| 6
| 0.45
| 3.97
| 3
| 
|-
| 14
| 
| 0.833
| 
| 6
| 
| 3.12
| 2
| Grand Finals episode (Live broadcast; episode broadcast starts at 20:10)
|}

Notes

References

External links
 

Singer (TV series)
2019 in Chinese music